Kozani National Airport "Filippos"  is located  southeast of the Greek city of Kozani. It started operations in the 1950s. Kozanis' and Kastorias' airports are the only two public airports in the region of Western Macedonia, Greece.

Airlines and destinations
The following airlines operate regular scheduled and charter flights at Kozani National Airport:

Statistics

See also
Transport in Greece

References

External links 

Airports in Greece
Kozani
Buildings and structures in Kozani (regional unit)
Transport in Western Macedonia